

See also
 2006 in Australia
 2006 in Australian television
 List of 2006 box office number-one films in Australia

2006
Australian
Films